Cheremshan may refer to:
Cheremshan River, several rivers in Russia
Cheremshan (rural locality), several rural localities in the Republic of Tatarstan, Russia
Cheremshan Dimitrovgrad, a bandy club based in Dimitrovgrad, Russia